The Ownership, Unity and Responsibility Party (or Our Party) is a political party in the Solomon Islands.

The party was established on 16 January 2010 (and officially launched a month later) by the leader of the Opposition (and former Prime Minister), Manasseh Sogavare, and eight opposition MPs.  It contested the 2010 elections.

The party has stated its intention to "invest $780 million over a period of 4 years in the rural economy from our own sources to improve the participation of our people in economic development". Provincial governments would be required to take an active part in rural development. It has also promised to consider whether it may be possible to restore customary ownership of land alienated for public purposes during the colonial era, notably in Honiara. In this respect, the party said it would be guided by the customary land ownership policy implemented in Vanuatu.

During the party's official launch mid-February, in Gizo, Sogavare added that, despite "millions of dollars worth of logs" exported from Western Province, landowners had received little in the way of revenue or improved government services. He later promised to address citizens' concerns about "the spill-over effects of the Bougainville crisis" on the maritime border with Papua New Guinea, and emphasised that national unity was "one of the core pillars" of OUR Party.

Later, in the context of the campaign for the 2010 general election, he stated:
"OUR Party is founded on Christian principles. OUR Party is committed to restore the ownership of this country to the people of Solomon Islands, both indigenous and naturalised. We are also committed to the course of national unity. We believe that we can only progress in developing our country if we are united and see each other as brothers and sisters. We are also committed to encouraging responsible leadership at all levels, including personal leadership. We are also committed to empowering our people through a development strategy that is people-centred, rural-focussed and growth-oriented."

Speaking in the party's name, he has also criticised the country's Truth and Reconciliation Commission, describing it as costly, excessively academic and guided by "foreign concepts", as opposed to more effective indigenous means of resolving conflicts and their aftermath.

Party secretary general Patterson Oti stated in May 2010 that the party would decentralise development programmes, to empower the provinces. In June, Sogavare "pledged to commit 6.2 million US$ to help relocate victims of climate change" if the party won the election.

External links
 An overview of the party's policies and priorities on its launch date (Solomon Star)

References

Political parties in the Solomon Islands
Political parties established in 2010
Main
2010 establishments in the Solomon Islands